Computhink is the developer of the document management, enterprise content management, records management, and document workflow software Contentverse and its cloud version, Contentverse Cloud.  

Computhink's headquarters are in Lombard, Illinois.

History
Computhink was established in 1994 in Chicago, IL. Computhink originally offered their document management solution under the name "The Paperless Office" on a 32-bit SQL database. In the year 2000, Computhink launched ViewWise and rebranded ViewWise in 2013; creating Contentverse 8 and its cloud version: Contentverse Cloud. Contentverse enables users to create an electronic filing system composed of cabinets, drawers, and folders, using index keys to manage and search a multitude of documents.

Contentverse fully enables users to reduce paper use and move to an electronic document management solution.
A paperless office is a more efficient, cost-saving, compliant organizational strategy.

Company history

Computhink Incorporated was founded in 1994 near Chicago, Illinois. The company originally sold a high security identification card production and management software program called IDtel. In their first year, Computhink sold one hundred IDtel systems to the United Nations for $1 million and became their sole ID tag provider. After the success with IDtel, Computhink created their first image viewing and management software program, The Paperless Office, in 1995. This was the first 32-bit software package designed for personal, single user, image viewer and image management use. Originally sold as a single user system, The Paperless Office was later developed to be used as a multiple user system.

By 1996, Computhink had operating offices in Chicago, London, Kuwait, South Africa, and Moscow with 85 total employees and consultants, and annual revenue exceeded $15 million. The single-user product was phased out, and network versions for small businesses were created and offered. As customer needs changed, Computhink moved from image management to document management. The reseller channel was developed in the United States and Internationally.

Between 1998 and 1999, The Paperless Office and IDtel were sold in 29 countries, across six continents. At this time, Computhink purchased Whetstone Technologies, the primary partner of Novell, to further expand their market presence. The Paperless Office was re-developed in Java and launched as ViewWise, the first ever server-based image-enabling product in the industry. In 2000, ViewWise became Novell’s preferred imaging partner, and Computhink decided to forego any involvement with the Whetstone Technologies products.

The network for domestic and international resellers was updated and broadened in 2006. Computhink became qualified as a Microsoft Front Runner, allowing them to release solutions alongside Microsoft’s product line. By 2008, Computhink had begun incorporating partnerships and connections with Kodak, Canon, and other third party viewers that complemented document management software. Computhink reached Tier III for the United Nations.

In 2013, the staff at Computhink realized that since 2006, the market’s needs and interests had shifted from document management to content management. Despite consistent updates and enhancements of ViewWise, the company decided to take the next step. The product was rebranded to Contentverse as the eighth version of the software. In 2014, version 8.1 of Contentverse was released.

External links
 Computhink Document Management Website
 Computhink India Document Management System Website

References

Companies based in DuPage County, Illinois
Computer companies of the United States
American  companies established in 1994
Business software companies